In Greek mythology, Argus or Argos (/ˈɑːrɡəs/; Ancient Greek: Ἄργος Argos) may refer to the following personages

 Argus Panoptes (Argus "All-Eyes"), a giant with a hundred eyes.
 Argus (king of Argos), son of Zeus (or Phoroneus) and Niobe (Argive).
Argus, son of Callirhoe and Piras (son of the above Argus) and brother to Arestorides and Triops.
 Argus, son of Phineus and Danaë, in a rare variant of the myth in which she and her two sons (the other being Argeus) travel to Italy.
 Argus or Argeus (king of Argos), son of Megapenthes.
 Argus (son of Arestor), builder of the ship Argo in the tale of the Argonauts.
 Argus, eldest son of Phrixus and Chalciope (Iophassa), and husband of Perimele, daughter of Admetus and Alcestis. By her, he became the father of Magnes, the father of Hymenaios.
Argus, son of Jason and Medea. He was loved by Heracles and because of him the hero joined Jason and the Argonauts.
Argus, son of Zeus and Lardane and brother of Sarpedon.
 Argus, son of Pan and among the Pans who came to join Dionysus in his campaign against India.
 Argus, a warrior in the army of the Seven against Thebes, who was killed by Hypseus, son of Asopus.
 Argus, son of Abas and one of the defenders of Thebes in the war of the Seven against Thebes. He was killed by Parthenopaeus, son of Atalanta.
 Argus or Argos (dog), the faithful dog of Odysseus.
 Argus, one of Actaeon's dogs

Notes

References 

 Antoninus Liberalis, The Metamorphoses of Antoninus Liberalis translated by Francis Celoria (Routledge 1992). Online version at the Topos Text Project.
 Apollodorus, The Library with an English Translation by Sir James George Frazer, F.B.A., F.R.S. in 2 Volumes, Cambridge, MA, Harvard University Press; London, William Heinemann Ltd. 1921. ISBN 0-674-99135-4. Online version at the Perseus Digital Library. Greek text available from the same website.
Apollonius Rhodius, Argonautica translated by Robert Cooper Seaton (1853-1915), R. C. Loeb Classical Library Volume 001. London, William Heinemann Ltd, 1912. Online version at the Topos Text Project.
 Apollonius Rhodius, Argonautica. George W. Mooney. London. Longmans, Green. 1912. Greek text available at the Perseus Digital Library.
 Gaius Julius Hyginus, Fabulae from The Myths of Hyginus translated and edited by Mary Grant. University of Kansas Publications in Humanistic Studies. Online version at the Topos Text Project.
 Gaius Valerius Flaccus, Argonautica translated by Mozley, J H. Loeb Classical Library Volume 286. Cambridge, MA, Harvard University Press; London, William Heinemann Ltd. 1928. Online version at theio.com.
 Gaius Valerius Flaccus, Argonauticon. Otto Kramer. Leipzig. Teubner. 1913. Latin text available at the Perseus Digital Library.
 Hesiod, Catalogue of Women from Homeric Hymns, Epic Cycle, Homerica translated by Evelyn-White, H G. Loeb Classical Library Volume 57. London: William Heinemann, 1914. Online version at theio.com
Homer, The Odyssey with an English Translation by A.T. Murray, PH.D. in two volumes. Cambridge, MA., Harvard University Press; London, William Heinemann, Ltd. 1919. Online version at the Perseus Digital Library. Greek text available from the same website.
 Nonnus of Panopolis, Dionysiaca translated by William Henry Denham Rouse (1863-1950), from the Loeb Classical Library, Cambridge, MA, Harvard University Press, 1940.  Online version at the Topos Text Project.
 Nonnus of Panopolis, Dionysiaca. 3 Vols. W.H.D. Rouse. Cambridge, MA., Harvard University Press; London, William Heinemann, Ltd. 1940-1942. Greek text available at the Perseus Digital Library.
The Orphic Argonautica, translated by Jason Colavito. © Copyright 2011. Online version at the Topos Text Project.
 Publius Papinius Statius, The Thebaid translated by John Henry Mozley. Loeb Classical Library Volumes. Cambridge, MA, Harvard University Press; London, William Heinemann Ltd. 1928. Online version at the Topos Text Project.
 Publius Papinius Statius, The Thebaid. Vol I-II. John Henry Mozley. London: William Heinemann; New York: G.P. Putnam's Sons. 1928. Latin text available at the Perseus Digital Library.

Princes in Greek mythology
Children of Zeus
Demigods in classical mythology
Characters in Seven against Thebes
Argive characters in Greek mythology
Colchian characters in Greek mythology
Theban characters in Greek mythology
Dionysus in mythology
Thessalian mythology
Children of Medea
Children of Jason